The statue of Saint Volodymyr in Holland Park, London, is a work of 1988 by the Canadian-Ukrainian sculptor Leo Mol. The bronze statue stands on the corner of Holland Park and Holland Park Avenue. It was unveiled on 29 May 1988, to commemorate the 1,000th anniversary of the Christianisation of Kievan Rus'. Later that year, another statue of Volodymyr by the same sculptor was erected in Rome.

See also
 Monument to Prince Volodymyr in Kyiv
 Monument to Vladimir the Great in Moscow

References

Bibliography
 

Statues in London
Buildings and structures in the Royal Borough of Kensington and Chelsea
Cultural depictions of Vladimir the Great
1988 sculptures
1988 establishments in England
1988 in London
Holland Park